Bheeloora is a panchayat village in Rajasthan in western India. Administratively it is under Sagwara Tehsil of Dungarpur district, Rajasthan.

Intro 
Bheeloora is a beautiful village situated in Vaagar area of Rajasthan, surrounded by water on each side.  It is just west of the Moran River. It is a very scenic village and has a major market. It is a major revenue generating village. There is a beautiful kund 'Suryakunda' in the village with Gomukh, wherefrom a continuous flow of water can be seen. Also, a 'Vadikhand temple' of spiritual importance lies at a beautiful location midst of farms outside village.

Infrastructure 
Bheeloora is connected with main road, so there is no any transportation problem.

Education level 
Bheeloora has around 8-10 schools including a main Government Senior Secondary school, Government middle school, Gurukul secondary public school and other 5-6 private schools, etc.  Around 80% of Bheeloora's population is educated in which half of them have graduate level education.  A few people have higher level education including Doctor, CA, Engineer, Lawyer, Computer Engg, Policemen etc. Bheeloora Senior school has a record 100% result for five consecutive years in Science stream.

Economics 
Bheeloora has good financial status among all Dungarpur villages with most of its revenues from shops around the village. An ample number of people are in Kuwait earning a handsome amount of money. Youngsters are either having their own business in Bheeloora itself or working in Ahmedabad, Mumbai, or nearby cities. Many of the people also generate money by farming.

Demographics
As of the 2011 census there were 1,375 families living in Bheeloora village.

Religion 
The village has around 12 major Hindu castes and also has a good number of Muslim families and celebrating their festivals joyously. All the festival celebrate all religion together

Festivals 
Bheeloora celebrates a variety of festivals, among which most famous Hindus festival are Holi, Diwali, Ravadi, Navratri, Dasehra, etc. Holi is one of the major attractions in Bheeloora where "Raad" (sling and stone Holi) is famous. It is on the day of Holi Festival and very famous among all surrounding villages of Bheeloora. More than ten thousand people gathered together for watching the Holi's "Raad" festival.
And Muslims festival are also celebrate all people together.

Basic necessities 
Bheeloora is up to date with most of the required things in the present scenario, including electricity, water, education, all mobile services, broadband, cable, bus and transportation, bank, etc. The only thing Bheeloora does not have is a police station, which in fact is not needed as there is very low crime rate. No doubt Bheeloora has very low crime rate but police station is one of the most requirement.

References 

Villages in Dungarpur district